USS San Pablo may refer to:

Ships
 , a United States Navy ship in commission as a seaplane tender (designated AVP-30) from 1943 to 1947 and as a hydrographic survey ship (redesignated AGS-30 in 1949) from 1948 to 1969

Literature and Film
USS San Pablo, a fictional United States Navy gunboat that is the setting for the 1962 novel The Sand Pebbles and the 1966 movie The Sand Pebbles

United States Navy ship names